Sfera (TEKh-44) is a small passive satellite deployed during a spacewalk from the ISS in August 2012.

Description
Also called the Vektor-T calibration sphere, the Sfera satellite is used to determine the density of the upper atmosphere by measuring how much drag occurs when the satellite passes through it. 

TEKh-44 is a shiny sphere 53 cm (20.8 inches) across weighing 14 kg (~31 pounds).

Re-entry
It  re-entered the atmosphere in late November 2012.

See also
List of passive satellites

References

External links
Sfera deployed

Passive satellites
Spacecraft which reentered in 2012
Spheres
Atmospheric sounding satellites